is a three-episode OVA (original video animation) series based on the 2004 tokusatsu (live-action) film Cutie Honey, both being adaptations of the 1970s manga written and illustrated by Go Nagai.  The series was co-produced with Gainax and Toei Animation, directed by Hideaki Anno, and shown on the Animax satellite television network in 2004.  The first episode aired on July 24, two months after the live-action film was released. DVD releases for each episode followed, with the first released on September 21.  The series tells the same story as the film, but contains nudity and additional character development.

Plot 
A mysterious organization known as Panther Claw make their presence known by terrorizing Tokyo and giving the cops a run for their money. Police are further baffled by the appearance of a lone cosplaying vigilante who thwarts all of Panther Claw's evil schemes before disappearing. That vigilante is Honey Kisaragi, the result of the late Dr. Kisaragi's prize experiment. A master of disguise, Honey can instantly alter her physical appearance and outfits. But with a push of the heart-shaped button on her choker, she transforms herself into Cutie Honey, the scantily clad, sword-wielding warrior of love.

Characters

Protagonists

Honey Kisaragi works as a temp at an office in Tokyo. She's also an android out to get revenge against Panther Claw for killing her father. Her weapons are a boomerang, a rapier, a lance, and her "I System" (Imaginary Induction System.)

Seiji Hayami claims to be a journalist, but he seems to know a good deal about the technology that Cutie Honey utilizes, and seems to be studying her closely.

Inspector Natsuko Aki is in charge of bringing Panther Claw to justice. She has incredible aim with firearms and can be fearless even if it is raining bullets. Initially a harsh, no-nonsense person, she and Honey eventually grow close as Honey's courage and cheerfulness begin to break their personality gaps.

She is the janitor at Honey's work who's always bringing onigiri for her. She is later revealed to be more than just a simple janitor.

Panther Claw 

The Club of the Four Gods, Gold Claw is the first truly powerful foe that Honey faces. Heavily armed and armored, Honey needs to be resourceful to find a way to defeat her. Gold Claw has Destroyer Panther, Doctor Panther, and Scope Panther as goons. She is killed by Honey in the first episode.

The Diamond of the Four Gods, Cobalt Claw has a pair of tentacles that extend out of her mask that can wrap around a foe and generate an incredible amount of electrical current. Cobalt relishes the opportunity to show off her strength to Sister Jill and defeating Cutie Honey. She is killed by Scarlet Claw in her plan to appease Sister Jill.

The Heart of the Four Gods, Scarlet Claw is a pint-size villain with an umbrella that can vaporize a foe. Very manipulative, Scarlet Claw is able to turn the general populace against Honey. Scarlet's goons include Tank Panther, Bazooka Panther, and Sky Panther. She is killed by Honey's Lightning Lancer in the second episode.

The Spade of The Four Gods, Black Claw's primary attack is with vocal sound waves that she amplifies with her microphone and staff. As much as she tries to comprehend, she can't figure out what Sister Jill truly desires. A homage to Baron Ashura and Count Brocken, the classic Mazinger Z villains also created by Go Nagai.

Sister Jill is the leader of Panther Claw. The Four Gods of Panther Claw act to realize her wishes. Her preferred weapon is a whip which can summon shadow hands. Jill is served by The Four Gods of Panther Claw as well as a mysterious butler. In the last episode she possesses a demonic body that heavily resembles Demon Lord Dante, one of Go Nagai's earliest works. It is also revealed that she was the first attempt of Dr. Kisaragi to replicate Honey after her initial death through the use of nano-machines.

Production 
The series makes references to other anime such as Lupin III and Sailor Moon, and many references to Kill Bill.  As with prior Cutie Honey series, the OVA also features cameos from some of Go Nagai's other works, including Akira Fudo of Devilman, Kouji Kabuto and Boss from Mazinger Z, Duke Fleed from Grendizer, and previous Cutie Honey regular Danbei.

Each of the episodes in the series had its own director in addition to Anno; a reviewer on the Gainax fansite Gainax Pages said that the episodes have such differing styles that "each episode director must have had considerable autonomy".

Re: Cutie Honey, like the 1970s manga, portrays Cutie Honey with dark-reddish eyes, not green eyes as in New Cutie Honey and Cutie Honey Flash;  in Re: Cutie Honey she also wears an outfit that covers more of her cleavage than the other versions, but shows her midriff and other parts.

The opening theme, used for both the OVA and the live-action movie, is "Cutie Honey," whilst the ending theme is "Into your Heart", both performed by Koda Kumi.

Media

Series 
The Re: Cutie Honey Complete DVD, released on September 21, 2005, includes a CD drama starring the four voice actresses that have voiced Honey up to then: Eiko Masuyama (the '70s series), Michiko Neya (New Cutie Honey), Ai Nagano (Cutie Honey Flash), and Yui Horie (Re: Cutie Honey).

Episodes 
Volume Heaven
Volume Earth
Volume Human
Volume Harmony (Drama CD)

Reception 
The OVA's visuals have generated mixed reactions; an Anime on DVD review praises the vibrancy of the digital ink and paint, saying it "brings Honey’s world to life" compared to older Cutie Honey series. However, a review on the website Japan Hero criticizes the animation, calling it "distorted", "garish", "sub par and truly unsettling", except in "the fantastic title animation".  Still, the series itself has been praised for its story and music, and has been called "creative, funny, and never repetitive". Erica Friedman of Okazu argued that the series strikes the "perfect balance between honestly good and enjoyably bad," adding that the anime does a "spectacular use of fanservice" as Na-chan tries to bring Cutie back to life, noting that in the series epilogue Na-chan and Honey "appear to be...a couple." She concluded it is a positive for those fans who wouldn't mind their yuri with "a shaker or two of parody, perversion and pathos."

References

Further reading

External links 
  

2004 anime OVAs
Cutie Honey
Gainax
Magical girl anime and manga
Toei Animation original video animation

ja:キューティーハニー#OVA「Re:キューティーハニー」